Asura  is a 2001 Indian Kannada action film directed by S. Mahendar, starring Shiva Rajkumar and Damini, with Raghuvaran and Ananth Nag in other pivotal roles. 

The film is about an underworld don's henchman who falls in love with a police officer's adopted daughter. The film is a remake of the 1999 Tamil film Amarkalam, starring Ajith Kumar, Shalini and Raghuvaran.

Cast

Shiva Rajkumar as Vasu 
Damini as Mohana 
Raghuvaran as Tulasi 
Ananth Nag as Birla Bose
Chitra Shenoy as Gayathri
Gazal Khan as Don Jayaraj 
Doddanna as Theatre manager 
Sharan as Billa
Michel Madhu as Ranga
Aravind as Ashok Bose
Kote Prabhakar 
Girish Shetty
Vijay Kumar as Ranjith Bose 
Mandya Ramesh as Cheluva 
Vanitha Vasu as Ganga 
Pushpa Swamy
Raghava Lawrence in a special appearance in the song 'Maha Ganapathi'

Soundtrack
The film's score and the soundtrack were composed by Gurukiran. All songs were retained as the same tune from the original version by Bharadwaj.

References

Kannada remakes of Tamil films
Indian romantic action films
2001 films
2000s Kannada-language films
Films scored by Gurukiran
Films directed by S. Mahendar
2001 action films